Nahuel Oscar Calvo (born 21 August 1996) is an Argentine professional footballer who plays as a defender for Defensores Unidos.

Career
Calvo began his career with Defensores Unidos in 2016. One goal in fourteen appearances followed across the 2016–17 and 2017–18 seasons in Primera C Metropolitana, with the club winning promotion as champions during the latter. His first Primera B Metropolitana appearance arrived on 18 May 2019 in an away defeat to Flandria; as he featured for the full duration of the final day fixture. In January 2020, Calvo joined Villa San Antonio on a six-month loan deal. He appeared six times in the Torneo Regional Federal Amateur, prior to the season's curtailment due to the COVID-19 pandemic.

In June 2020, Calvo returned to Defensores Unidos and renewed his contract until December.

Career statistics
.

Honours
Defensores Unidos
Primera C Metropolitana: 2017–18

References

External links

1996 births
Living people
Place of birth missing (living people)
Argentine footballers
Association football defenders
Primera C Metropolitana players
Primera B Metropolitana players
Defensores Unidos footballers